The 1908 Campeonato Carioca, the third edition of that championship, kicked off on May 3, 1908 and ended on November 1, 1908. It was organized by LMSA (Liga Metropolitana de Sports Athleticos, or Metropolitan Athletic Sports League). Six teams participated. Fluminense won the title for the 3rd time. No teams were relegated.

Participating teams

System 
The tournament would be disputed in a double round-robin format, with the team with the most points winning the title.

Championship

References 

Campeonato Carioca seasons
Carioca